William Butler (1814 – 4 March 1875) was a 19th-century Member of Parliament in Auckland, New Zealand.

Butler was born in England in 1814 and went to sea at a young age. By age 24, he was commander of a sailing ship that traded with Australia. He traded and was a whaler. He settled in Mangonui (then spelled Mongonui) in Northland, New Zealand and his children were born there from 1841.

He represented the Mongonui electorate from 1861 to 1866, when he retired.

Butler died on 4 March 1875.

References

1814 births
1875 deaths
Members of the New Zealand House of Representatives
New Zealand MPs for North Island electorates
19th-century New Zealand politicians
Lusk family